Timothy John Bernhardt (born January 17, 1958) is a retired professional ice hockey goaltender who played 67 games in the National Hockey League with the Toronto Maple Leafs and Calgary Flames between 1982 and 1986.

Playing career
Bernhardt began his career with the Sarnia Junior Bees in 1974 and then with the Cornwall Royals of the Quebec Major Junior Hockey League from 1975 to 1978. From 1978 to 1983 he played for several CHL teams (Tulsa Oilers, Birmingham Bulls, Oklahoma City Stars and the Colorado Flames). Prior to joining Calgary, Bernhardt played with the Rochester Americans of the American Hockey League. Bernhardt played for Canada during the World Junior Championships in 1977–1978.

From 1983 to 1990, Bernhardt split his time between the Toronto Maple Leafs and the AHL farm clubs, the St. Catharines Saints and Newmarket Saints.

Post-playing career
After retirement, he worked as a scout for the Dallas Stars until 2011. He was a key person in the Stars organization as he was responsible for drafting players such as Steve Ott, Mike Smith, Jussi Jokinen, Trevor Daley, Loui Eriksson, James Neal, Matt Niskanen and Jamie Benn. Bernhardt served as the director of amateur scouting for the Arizona Coyotes until 2018.

Career statistics

Regular season and playoffs

International

References

External links
 

1958 births
Living people
Arizona Coyotes scouts
Atlanta Flames draft picks
Birmingham Bulls (CHL) players
Calgary Flames players
Canadian expatriate ice hockey players in the United States
Canadian ice hockey goaltenders
Dallas Stars scouts
Ice hockey people from Ontario
Newmarket Saints players
Oklahoma City Stars players
Rochester Americans players
St. Catharines Saints players
Sportspeople from Sarnia
Toronto Maple Leafs players
Tulsa Oilers (1964–1984) players